The Oldenburg Class T 5.1 was a German steam locomotive built for the Grand Duchy of Oldenburg State Railways as a tank engine for passenger train duties. Its design was based on that of the Prussian T 5.1. 

The firm of Hanomag manufactured 20 units of the Oldenburg T 5.1 between 1907 and 1921. Like its Prussian sisters it had the defect of poor riding qualities at high speeds. As a result, during the delivery of these engines design changes were made to the running gear, for example the overall wheelbase was increased. But even these measures met with no success.

The Deutsche Reichsbahn took over all 20 locomotives in 1925 as DRG Class 71.4 and gave them numbers 71 401 to 71 420. They were retired by 1930.

See also
Grand Duchy of Oldenburg State Railways
List of Oldenburg locomotives and railbuses
Länderbahnen

References 

 
 
 

2-4-2T locomotives
T 5.1
Railway locomotives introduced in 1907
Hanomag locomotives
Standard gauge locomotives of Germany
1′B1′ n2t locomotives

Passenger locomotives